The landing craft mechanized (LCM) is a landing craft designed for carrying vehicles. They came to prominence during the Second World War when they were used to land troops or tanks during Allied amphibious assaults.

Variants 

There was no single design of LCM used, unlike the landing craft, vehicle, personnel (LCVP) or Landing Craft Assault (LCA) landing craft made by the US and UK respectively. There were several different designs built by the UK and US and by different manufacturers.

The British Motor Landing Craft (MLC) was conceived and tested in the 1920s and was used from 1924 in exercises. Nine were in service at the start of the war. It was the first purpose built tank landing craft. It was the progenitor of all subsequent LCM designs.

LCM (1) 

 
The landing craft, mechanised Mark I was an early British model. It was able to be slung under the davits of a liner or on a cargo ship boom with the result that it was limited to a 16-ton tank.

The LCM Mark I was used during the Allied landings in Norway (one alongside the MLCs), and at Dieppe and some 600 were built.

Displacement: 35 tonnes
Length: 
Width: 
Draught: 
Machinery: two Chrysler 100 hp petrol engines
Speed: 7 knots
Crew: 6 men
Armament: two .303 in. Lewis guns
Capacity: one medium tank, or 26.8 tons of cargo or 60 troops
100 men

LCM (2) 

Displacement: 29 tons
Length: 45 ft (14 m)
Beam: 14 ft 1 in (4.3 m)
Draft: 3 ft (0.91 m)
Speed: 8.5 knots (15.7 km/h)
Armament: two .50-cal M2 Browning machine guns
Crew: 4
Capacity; 100 troops, or one 13.5 ton tank, or 15 tons of cargo

The first American LCM design, from the US Navy's Bureau of Construction and Repair. Approximately 150 were built by American Car & Foundry and Higgins Industries.

LCM (3) 

There were two designs:
Bureau
Capable of carrying  of cargo
Higgins
Another Higgins LCM-3 is  displayed at the Museo Storico Piana delle Orme in Province of Latina, Italy, 18 miles East of Anzio.

Displacement: 52 tons (loaded); 23 tons (empty) 
Length: 
Beam: 
Draft:  (forward);  (aft)
Speed:  (loaded);  (empty) 
Armament: two .50-cal M2 Browning machine guns
Crew: 4
Capacity: One 30-ton tank (e.g.

LCM (4) 
In the years 1943 and 1944, seventy-seven LCM(4)s were built. Outwardly, the LCM(4) was almost completely identical to a late model LCM(1) – the difference lay inside the pontoon. Here special bilge pumps and special ballast tanks allowed the LCM(4) to alter trim to increase stability when partially loaded.

LCM (5) 
British model of LCM

LCM (6) 
An LCM (3) extended by  amidships. Many were later adapted as Armored Troop Carriers (ATCs or "Tangos") for the Mobile Riverine Force in the Vietnam War; others became "Monitors" with 105mm guns, "Zippos" with flamethrowers or "Charlie" command variants.

 Power plant:
 2 Detroit 6-71 diesel engines;  sustained; twin shaft; or
 2 Detroit 8V-71 diesel engines;  sustained; twin shaft
 Length: 56.2 feet (17.1 m)
 Beam: 14 feet (4.3 m)
 Displacement: 64 tons (65 metric tons) full load
 Speed: 9 knots (10.3 mph, 16.6 km/h)
 Range: 130 miles (240 km) at 
 Military lift: 34 tons (34.6 metric tons) or 80 troops
 Crew: 5

LCM (7) 
British model of LCM

LCM (8) 

General characteristics, LCM 8 Type
 Power plant: four 6-71 six-cylinder diesels, two hydraulic transmissions, two propeller shafts. (Lighterage Division, Naval Support Activity Danang 1969-1970) crew of 3: coxswain, bowhook, and engineer (aka "snipe")
 Power plant: 2 Detroit 12V-71 diesel engines;  sustained; twin shafts
 Length: 73.7 feet (22.5 m)
 Beam: 21 feet (6.4 m)
 Displacement: 105 tons (106.7 metric tons) full load
 Speed: 12 kt (13.8 mph, 22.2 km/h)
 Range: 190 nm (350 km) at  full load
 Capacity: 53.5 tons (54.4 metric tons)
 Military lift: one M48 or one M60 tank or 200 troops
 Crew: 5

Operators
 – Turkish Naval Forces
 – United States Navy, U.S. Army 7th Transportation Brigade Expeditionary
 – Royal Thai Navy
 – Royal Australian Navy
 – Australian Army
 – Spanish Navy
 – Navy of El Salvador
 – Royal New Zealand Navy
 – Egyptian Navy
 – Royal Saudi Navy
 - Pakistan Navy
 - Japan Maritime Self-Defense Force
 - Vietnam People's Navy

Former operators
 – Khmer National Navy
 – Republic of Vietnam Navy

See also 

Motor Landing Craft
Landing Craft, Tank
LCVP (United States)
LCM2000
LCM 25 ton type - Japanese version of LCM-6

Notes

References 
Gordon L. Rottman & Tony Bryan, Landing Ship, Tank (LST) 1942–2002, New Vanguard series 115, Osprey Publishing Ltd, Oxford 2005. 
Gordon L. Rottman & Hugh Johnson, Vietnam Riverine Craft 1962–75, New Vanguard series 128, Osprey Publishing Ltd, Oxford 2006. 
Gordon L. Rottman & Peter Bull, Landing Craft, Infantry and Fire Support, New Vanguard series 157, Osprey Publishing Ltd, Oxford 2009. 
Maund, LEH Assault From the Sea, Methuen & Co. Ltd., London 1949.

External links 
Skill in the Surf: A Landing Boat Manual
LCM-6 principal characteristics
History of "Logistics over The Shore" operations
LCM & LCU fact file
LCM information
USS Rankin (AKA-103): LCM
LCM-6 Xj3D/VRML model
LCM-6 surface textures required for Xj3D/VRML model

Landing craft
Ship types